EVN AD Skopje is a power distribution and supply company in North Macedonia. It was split in 2005 from former state integrated power company ESM and bought in 2006 by Austrian-based EVN Group. The company has about 800 000 electricity meters in the country.

History 

In 2005, the former state monopoly ESM ( [], litt. Electricity of Macedonia) was split in three companies:
 A distribution and supply company, initially called ESM AD, sold in 2006 to Austrian EVN Group and renamed as EVN Macedonia, rebranded in 2019 as EVN AD Skopje.
 A state-owned power-producing company, initially called ELEM ( [], litt. Power plants of Macedonia), in charge of the country's power plants. The company was renamed in 2019 as ESM (Elektrani na Severna Makedonija, litt. Power plants of North Macedonia) after the country itself changed its name to North Macedonia, reverting to the initialism used between 1990 and 2006.
 A state-owned transmission system operator MEPSO

Notes

References 

Electric power companies of North Macedonia
Companies based in Skopje
Macedonian companies established in 2006
Energy companies established in 2006